Appias lyncida, the chocolate albatross, is a butterfly of the family Pieridae, that is, the yellows and whites, which is found in south and southeast Asia.

Range
The chocolate albatross is found in India, China, Sri Lanka, Myanmar, Malaysia, Indonesia, Philippines, Thailand, Laos, Indochina, Taiwan, Hainan and possibly South China.

In India, the butterfly ranges across south India, Nicobar islands, Sikkim to Assam, and onto Myanmar. In South India, the chocolate albatross is to be found along the foot of the Western Ghats. It is found throughout the year in the Nilgiris where it is locally common. In the northern parts of peninsular India it extends into Orissa and north up to Lucknow.

Status
In India, the northern race of the butterfly is common, while it is local and scarce in other parts of its range.

Description

The chocolate albatross has a wingspan of 55 to 70 mm. The male is white above with chocolate-brown or black margins, and, bright lemon yellow below with chocolate-coloured markings. The female is white and densely clouded with dark brown.

The butterfly shows seasonal dimorphism and is very variable. The detailed descriptions are as follows:
Wet-season form:
Male - white above, with bluish costa and termen inwardly edged with black teeth-like markings on the forewing. The hindwing is similarly toothed on the termen, which has a bluish inward border. The underside of the hindwing is bright yellow and is outwardly bordered with dark chocolate.
Female - black upperside of the forewing with four white streaks on the disc. Blackish upperside of the hindwing except for the whitish discal area. The underside of the hindwing may be yellowish or whitish and have broad dark band at the termen.
 Dry-season form: smaller.
Male - The male has narrower black margins above.
Female - Similar above to the wet-season form, but with more extensive white markings.

Habits
Flying strongly and swiftly close to the ground, the albatross is frequently found in jungle clearings and along stream banks. The males are often found circling around trees and bushes. The chocolate albatross often mudpuddles, sometimes in large numbers. The butterfly occasionally visits flowers and has been recorded to visit Verbena flowers in Kodagu.

Life cycle
The larvae have been recorded on Crataeva religiosa, Capparis roxburghii and Capparis heyneana.

See also
Pieridae
List of butterflies of India
List of butterflies of India (Pieridae)

Notes

References
 
 
 
 
 Arun, P. R. (2000). Seasonality and abundance of insects with special reference to butterflies (Lepidoptera: Rhopalocera) in a Moist deciduous forest of Siruvani, Nilgiri Biosphere Reserve, South India Ph.D Thesis, Bharathiar University, Coimbatore. 236p.

External links
 CSIRO Australia EntomID-PNG Specimen Database 
 ASEAN centre for Biodiversity 
 Photos of Singapore Butterflies The Chocolate Albatross  (Archived 2009-10-25)

Appias (butterfly)
Butterflies of Asia
Butterflies described in 1777
Taxa named by Pieter Cramer